Jennifer Barrett is an American Paralympic athlete who competed at the 1996 Summer Paralympics and 2000 Summer Paralympics for Team USA.

Career
Barrett competed in the 1996 Summer Paralympics and 2000 Summer Paralympics for Team USA. During her first Paralympic Games, she earned a bronze medal in Women's Shot Put F42-44/46 and a gold medal in Women's Discus Throw F42-44/46. In the 2000 Paralympics, Barrett earned a silver medal in Women's Discus Throw F46 and a bronze medal in Women's Shot Put F46. She also holds the world record in discus and the United States national record for shot put.

References

Sonoma State University alumni
Paralympic bronze medalists for the United States
Paralympic silver medalists for the United States
Paralympic gold medalists for the United States
American female track and field athletes
Paralympic medalists in athletics (track and field)
Paralympic track and field athletes of the United States
Living people
Year of birth missing (living people)
21st-century American women